The Matrimonial Web is a 1921 American silent crime drama film directed by Edward José and starring Alice Calhoun, Joseph Striker and Riley Hatch.

Cast
 Alice Calhoun as Helen Anderson
 Joseph Striker as Harvey Blake
 Riley Hatch as Revenue Officer Anderson 
 Armand Cortes as Gregory 
 Charles Mackay as Cyrus Blake
 Elsie Fuller as Miriam Blake
 Ernest Hilliard as Irving Sneed
 Marion Barney as Mrs. Sanborn
 Edith Stockton as Dorothy Sanborn
 G.C. Frye as Judge Cameron
 Dick Lee as Smuggler

References

Bibliography
 Connelly, Robert B. The Silents: Silent Feature Films, 1910-36, Volume 40, Issue 2. December Press, 1998.
 Munden, Kenneth White. The American Film Institute Catalog of Motion Pictures Produced in the United States, Part 1. University of California Press, 1997.

External links
 

1921 films
1921 drama films
1920s English-language films
American silent feature films
Silent American drama films
American black-and-white films
Films directed by Edward José
Vitagraph Studios films
1920s American films